Adelotypa bolena is a species of butterfly in the family Riodinidae. It is found in Brazil and Paraguay. It is the type species of the genus Adelotypa.

Description

Bright yellow, the base of the wings, a broad apical band of the forewing, the apex and anal angle of the hindwing resembling the colour of the trunk of a tree. The shape of the broad apical spot seems to be different at every habitat. Beneath dark-yellow on light-yellow, marked with dashes shape of the broad apical spot seems to be different at every habitat. Found singly and not common; flies in day-time and likes to rest on the trunks of trees.

References

External links

Adelotypa at butterflies of america

Nymphidiini
Butterflies described in 1867
Taxa named by Arthur Gardiner Butler
Riodinidae of South America